The 1975 FIBA European Championship, commonly called FIBA EuroBasket 1975, was the nineteenth FIBA EuroBasket regional basketball championship, held by FIBA Europe.

Venues

First round

Group A – Split

Group B – Karlovac

Group C – Rijeka

Second round

Places 7 – 12

Places 1 – 6 in Belgrade

Final standings

Awards

Team rosters
1. Yugoslavia: Krešimir Ćosić, Dražen Dalipagić, Mirza Delibašić, Dragan Kićanović, Zoran Slavnić, Nikola Plećaš, Željko Jerkov, Vinko Jelovac, Damir Šolman, Rato Tvrdić, Rajko Žižić, Dragan Kapičić (Coach: Mirko Novosel)

2. Soviet Union: Sergei Belov, Alexander Belov, Ivan Edeshko, Alzhan Zharmukhamedov, Mikheil Korkia, Aleksander Sidjakin, Valeri Miloserdov, Yuri Pavlov, Aleksander Boloshev, Aleksander Salnikov, Vladimir Zhigili, Aleksander Bolshakov (Coach: Vladimir Kondrashin)

3. Italy: Dino Meneghin, Pierluigi Marzorati, Carlo Recalcati, Renzo Bariviera, Renato Villalta, Ivan Bisson, Lorenzo Carraro, Fabrizio della Fiori, Marino Zanatta, Gianni Bertolotti, Giulio Iellini, Vittorio Ferracini (Coach: Giancarlo Primo)

4. Spain: Juan Antonio Corbalán, Wayne Brabender, Clifford Luyk, Rafael Rullan, Luis Miguel Santillana, Manuel Flores, Carmelo Cabrera, Cristóbal Rodríguez, Jesus Iradier, Miguel Angel Lopez Abril, Juan Filba, Miguel Angel Estrada (Coach: Antonio Díaz-Miguel)

References

1975
1974–75 in European basketball
1974–75 in Yugoslav basketball
International basketball competitions hosted by Yugoslavia
International sports competitions in Belgrade
1970s in Belgrade
Sport in Rijeka
Sports competitions in Split, Croatia
Sport in Karlovac
June 1975 sports events in Europe
1975 in Serbia
Basketball in Belgrade